Jidi may refer to:
 Jidi, Azerbaijan, a village in Gəgiran, Lankaran Rayon, Azerbaijan
 Jidi (cartoonist), Chinese cartoonist